The Ambassador Extraordinary and Plenipotentiary of Peru in Canada is the head of the diplomatic mission of Peru to Canada.

Both countries established relations in 1944.

Partial list of Peruvian ambassadors to Canada

References

Canada
Peru